Abuse of parents by their children, also known as child-to-parent violence (CPV), is a form of domestic violence where parents receive maltreatment from their child or children. It is one of the most under-reported and under-researched subject areas in the field of psychology. Parents are quite often subject to levels of childhood aggression in excess of normal childhood aggressive outbursts, typically in the form of verbal or physical abuse. Parents feel a sense of shame and humiliation to have that problem, so they rarely seek help.

Parent abuse has been defined by Cottrell (2001, p. 3) as "any harmful act of a teenage child intended to gain power and control over a parent. The abuse can be physical, psychological, or financial". Though this type of abuse often takes places during the teen years (often from 12 to 17), it can happen earlier than that, with some reports showing cases of children younger than 10 years old. For example, a case of a daughter providing housing for her elderly parents. The daughter often insults her parents, controls what they do or go, and expects them to do whatever she says, because she is the owner of the house. A Sheriff Deputy was sent to investigate, but the parents were very positive about living with her so the report by the Social Workers was dismissed . The effects of experiencing abuse from one's child can be profound. In the short term, ongoing parent abuse has been found to impact on a parent's and other family members’ physical and psychological health, with specific negative emotions such as fear, shame, guilt and despair commonly reported (Cottrell & Monk, 2004).

The causes are yet to be thoroughly researched, but three main variables have been suggested as possible contributors to child to parent abuse: 

 the presence of a mental health condition;
 attachment difficulties (which might or might not be related to a mental health issue) and/or;
 previous experiences of abuse. 

A child may be abusive because they have suffered some form of abuse themselves, although this may not always be the case. Parent abuse may derive not only from individualized issues, but also from structural societal and cultural factors.

Introduction
Adolescent abuse towards parents and grandparents is a problem in the United States, as well as other countries around the world. However, it is not often discussed or reported, as most family abuse remains hidden from public view until law enforcement becomes involved. Child abuse and spousal abuse are discussed, but parents abused by their own offspring are still considered by many to be a taboo subject, according to some researchers.  Reasons for this may be that parents feel ashamed or think they should be able to handle the situation by themselves without outside assistance.  In addition, some parents may feel it is not safe for them to attempt to control the situation because it might further enrage their child. However, any form of abuse is harmful to the victim as well as the abuser, and may lead to more serious consequences if ignored. Identifying or admitting there is a problem is the first step to finding a solution to adolescent parental abuse, and seeking help through intervention is the next step to attempt to resolve problematic adolescent behavior.

It is difficult to ascertain the prevalence of the phenomenon due to the fact that it is hugely under-reported by parents. Research carried out in Canada, United States, and Oceania, suggest that mothers, lone parents as well as parents facing social and family difficulties are more probable to experience parental abuse, no matter if a child has experienced violence in the family or not.

A unique factor in parental abuse is 'the culture of blame', which has deepened over the past decade.

Demographics

Age
Parental abuse by adolescents may be relatively common; an adolescent is a young person between the ages of 12 and 19. However, abusers can be 10 or younger.

Types of abuse

According to Cottrell and Bobic, abuse may appear in one or a combination of five forms; physical, verbal, psychological, emotional, and financial.  Bobic mentioned only four of the five listed abuses; verbal abuse was not included in her 2004 article, Adolescent Violence Towards Parents.

Multiple causes of abusive behavior
Many people consider parent abuse to be the result of bad parenting, neglect, or the child suffering abuse themselves, which some certainly have experienced, but other adolescent abusers have had "normal" upbringing and have not suffered from these situations.  Children may be subjected to violence on TV, in movies and in music, and that violence may come to be considered "normal."  The breakdown of the family unit, poor or nonexistent relationships with an absent parent, as well as, debt, unemployment, and parental drug/alcohol abuse may all be contributing factors to abuse.  Some other reasons for parental abuse according to several experts are:

Arguments getting out of control
Aggressive behavioral tendencies
Frustration or inability to deal with problems
Not having learned how to manage (or control) angry feelings
Not able to learn how to manage or control behavior due to brain damage
Witnessing other abuses at home can cause similar behaviors
Lack of respect for their parents – perceived weakness
 Lack of consequences for bad behavior
Children who have been abused may begin to fight back against their abusers
Fear
Drugs and alcohol
Gang culture
Not having adequate role models
Not being able to properly deal with a disabled or mentally ill parent(s)
Revenge or punishment for something the parents did or did not do
Mental illness
Not being able to cope correctly
Corporal punishment

History
Parental abuse is a relatively new term. In 1979, Harbin and Madden released a study using the term "parent battery" but juvenile delinquency, which is a major factor, has been studied since the late 19th century.  Even though some studies have been done in the United States, Australia, Canada, and other countries, the lack of reporting of adolescent abuse toward parents makes it difficult to accurately determine the extent of it.  Many studies have to rely on self-reporting by adolescents. In 2004, Robinson, of Brigham Young University, published: Parent Abuse on the Rise: A Historical Review in the American Association of Behavioral Social Science Online Journal, reporting results of the 1988 study performed by Evans and Warren-Sohlberg.  The results reported that 57% of parental abuse was physical; using a weapon at 17%; throwing items at 5% and verbal abuse reported at 22%.  With 82% of the abuse being against mothers (five times greater than against fathers) and 11% of the abusers were under the age of 10 years.  The highest rate of abuse happens within families with a single mother.   Mothers are usually the primary caregiver; they spend more time with their children than fathers and have closer emotional connections to them.  It can also be due to the size and strength of the abuser and women are often thought of as weaker and even powerless.  Parental abuse can occur in any family and it is not necessarily associated with ethnic background, socio-economic class, or sexual orientation.

Numerous studies concluded that gender does not play a role in the total number of perpetrators; however, males are more likely to inflict physical abuse and females are more likely to inflict emotional abuse.  Studies from the United States estimate that violence among adolescents peaks at 15–17 years old.  However, a Canadian study done by Barbara Cottrell in 2001 suggests the ages are 12–14 years old.

Parental abuse does not happen just inside the home but can be in public places, further adding to the humiliation of the parents.  Abuse is not only a domestic affair but can be criminal as well.  Most teenagers experience a normal transition in which they try to go from being dependent to independent, but there are some dynamics of unhealthy parental control that also play a direct part in the failure to properly raise a child in this regard.  There will always be times of resistance toward parental authority.  According to the Canadian National Clearinghouse on family violence, the abuse generally begins with verbal abuse, but even then, some females can be very physically abusive towards a child who is smaller and more vulnerable than they are, and to cover their abuse, they often lie to the other parent about actual events that led to "severe punishment." The child, adolescent or parent may show no remorse or guilt and feels justified in the behavior, but many times when the child is the one who is being abused, they are very remorseful for being forced to defend themselves, especially when they are not the aggressor.  Parents must examine their children's behavior and determine if it is acceptable or if it crosses the line of abusiveness, just as a parent has the responsibility as an adult who is supposed to know better should be responsible for their own abuses towards a child.  Some teenagers can become aggressive as a result of parental abuses and dysfunction or psychological problems.  Some children may have trouble dealing with their emotions, that is all part of growing up but there is a line that should not be crossed and parents may determine where that line is.  Unfortunately, abused children are not afforded protections from abusive parents. This practice often helps discourage abusive behavior and show that it will not be tolerated.

Typical model of adolescent-parent abuse interaction
According to Spitzberg the typical interaction leading to parental abuse often seems to occur in the following sequence:

The adolescent makes a request.
The parent asks for clarifying information.
The adolescent responds courteously and provides the requested information.
The parent acknowledges the teen's point of view but decides to say "no" based on the information provided, while possibly continuing the conversation regarding a possible "next time".
The adolescent tries to change the mind of the parent by asking the parent to explain the decision, sometimes using the information to continue to challenge the parent until certain that the answer would not change.
If the parent holds firm to his or her decision, the teen may start using abusive remarks and threats, harass the parent by following the parent around, and finally responding with verbal threats, physical force, emotional abuse, and often destruction of property or financial damage.

These types of aggressive behaviors are very important to recognize for appropriate treatment of adolescents and parents abused by the same.  Yet the escalation of violence is an interactive process.  When parents or others overreact and intervene emotionally, they can cause the adolescent's aggression to escalate to a higher level, by exerting examples of violence and unreasonableness as a parent. The more tendency towards abuse and negative behaviors that the parent exemplifies, the more reactive the child will also be, more often in a negative manner. Balancing these two dynamics is the key to healthy family dynamics in reducing potential abuse within families, whether it be parental abuses or child abuses.

Intervention

Intervention is perhaps the best solution to confront adolescent parental abuse and the key to turn aggressive behavior by adolescents, teenagers, and young adults during its early stages and help prevent any other form of parental abuse from taking place.

While intervention is an option, it may not always work. There are times when the child does have a mental illness that does not allow the child, adolescent or teenager to understand what is exactly happening. Therefore, the individual acts out their emotions the only way they understand. This can present itself as violence, emotional abuse, destructive behaviors such as destroying personal property or self bodily injury. The United States currently protects abused children using Courts, Child Protective Services and other agencies. The US also has Adult Protective Services which is provided to abused, neglected, or exploited older adults and adults with significant disabilities. There are no agencies or programs that protect parents from abusive children, adolescents or teenagers other than giving up their parental rights to the state they live in.

See also
 Animal abuse
 Child abuse
 Dysfunctional family
 Elder abuse 
 Juvenile delinquency
 Parental alienation
 Runaway (dependent) 
 Sibling abuse, the abuse of children by their own siblings
 Substance abuse
 Teenage rebellion

References

Further reading
Retrieved 26 May 2012 from Parentlink - Abuse of parents
Retrieved 26 May 2012 from Parenting and Child Health - Health Topics -
Retrieved 26 May 2012 from angelsthatcare.org - This website is for sale! - Child abuse domestic violence Missing Children Resources and Information.
Retrieved 5 June 2012 from 
Lack of support for parents who live in fear of their teenagers, study shows

Abuse
Domestic violence
Parenting